The Supreme Court of the United States is the highest ranking judicial body in the United States. Established by Article III of the Constitution, the detailed structure of the Court was laid down by the 1st United States Congress in 1789. Congress specified the Court's original and appellate jurisdiction, created 13 judicial districts, and fixed the number of justices at sixone chief justice and five associate justices. The number of justices on the Supreme Court changed six times before settling at the present total of nine in 1869.

The following tables detail the succession of justices of the Supreme Court of the United States by seat. There are no formal numbers or names for the individual seats of associate justices, which are listed in this article simply by number, as well as by the date each was established by Congress. The numbering of associate justice seats 1–4 reflects the order of precedence of the inaugural justices to occupy those seats, which was based upon the seniority of their commission from President George Washington following their confirmation by the U.S. Senate. The fifth original associate justice seat, and the simultaneously created seventh and eighth seats, are numbered according to the order in which each seat's first occupant received their commission from the president following Senate confirmation. Seats six, nine, and 10 are numbered according to the order in which each was created by statute. The start date is the date the justice took the judicial oath of office, and the end date is the date of the justice's death, resignation, or retirement.

Original seats

The Judiciary Act of 1789 set the number of Supreme Court justices at six: one chief justice and five associate justices. One of the associate justice seats established in 1789 (seat 5 below) was later abolished, as a result of the Judicial Circuits Act of 1866, which provided for the gradual elimination of seats on the Supreme Court until there would be seven justices.

Additional seats

In 1807, Congress passed the Seventh Circuit Act, which added a sixth associate justice to the Supreme Court. Two more seats were added in 1837, as a result of the Eighth and Ninth Circuits Act; one of these (seat 7 below) was later abolished as a result of the Judicial Circuits Act of 1866. The Supreme Court reached its peak size in 1863, when the Tenth Circuit Act became law, and a tenth justice joined the Court. After fluctuating from nine to ten to eight members over a six-year period, the size of the Court was restored to nine members through the Circuit Judges Act of 1869, a broad Reconstruction era reorganization of the federal courts. This act remains the governing law regarding the number of seats on the Court.

See also
 List of justices of the Supreme Court of the United States
 List of justices of the Supreme Court of the United States by court composition
 List of United States Supreme Court justices by time in office

References

External links
Decisions and biography by Justice
The Supreme Court Historical Society

Seat